Tom Nyuma (died January 26, 2014) was a Sierra Leonean military commander and the chairman of the Kailahun District council.   He was elected as chairman of Kailahun District council on July 6, 2008 with 87% of the vote running on the opposition Sierra Leone People's Party (SLPP) ticket.

Nyuma was born in Kailahun, and was very popular in the Southern and Eastern regions of the country. In March 2012, Nyuma left the SLPP and joined the All People's Congress (APC) of President Ernest Bai Koroma.

He was at the rank of lieutenant colonel in the Republic of Sierra Leone Armed Forces before he retired.  On 29 April 1992, Nyuma was one of the young officers in the Sierra Leonean army who ousted the APC government led by Joseph Saidu Momoh. They established the National Provisional Ruling Council (NPRC) to run the government. During the NPRC administration, Nyuma was the commander of the Eastern Province. He was a member of the Kissi ethnic group and an alum of Ohio State University in Columbus, Ohio, US.

Notes 

2014 deaths
Sierra Leonean military personnel
Year of birth missing
People from Kailahun District
People from Bo, Sierra Leone
Ohio State University alumni